William Swainson may refer to:

William John Swainson (1789–1855), English ornithologist, malacologist, conchologist, entomologist and artist
William Swainson (lawyer) (1809–1884), English lawyer who helped to set up the legal system of New Zealand